Etherley Dene is a village in County Durham, in England. It is situated to the west of Bishop Auckland.

References

Villages in County Durham